Marian Cristian Ion (born September 14, 1988) is a Romanian long track speed skater who participates in international competitions.

Personal records

Career highlights
European Allround Championships
2008 – Kolomna, 26th
World Junior Allround Championships
2005 – Seinäjoki, 41st
2006 – Erfurt, 42nd

External links

Ion at Jakub Majerski's Speedskating Database
Ion at SkateResults.com

1988 births
Living people
Romanian male speed skaters